Bibi Blocksberg is a German audio drama series for children, created in 1980 by Elfie Donnelly. The main character is a girl called Bibi Blocksberg, who is a witch. As of March 2022, there have been 142 episodes. The title of the series used to be Eene meene Hexerei. This title was used for the first seven episodes, after which the series was renamed to Bibi Blocksberg. The first episodes were later released under the new title and with a new cover. The old episodes are very sought after among collectors. The length of the episodes originally varied between 35 and 40 minutes and nowadays between 40 and 45 minutes. An exception is episode #78 with a length of 52 minutes. Bibi's popularity during this era led to her becoming the official mascot of Kiddinx.

In the series, Bibi, who is fond of playing practical jokes, experiences numerous adventures with her friends. Magic often plays a major part, and often leads to trouble, and Bibi's mother, who is also a witch, must come to set things straight. Bibi's antagonist is often the mayor of Neustadt, who is presented as lazy and incompetent. This leads to conflict with the helpful Bibi.

The series is set in the same universe as Benjamin the Elephant. They both appear in some of the audio dramas of the other.

The surname of Bibi is a reference to the old name of the Brocken, a mountain in Saxony-Anhalt in its native Germany that is traditionally connected with witches (Walpurgis Night), most famously in Goethe's Faust.

The series was adapted into an animated series in 1995. 11 years later, in 2006, it was given an English dub produced by Ocean Productions and recorded at Blue Water Studios.

Characters

Bibi Blocksberg
Brigitte "Bibi" Blocksberg is a 13-year-old witch girl who has blonde hair tied to a pony tail with a red bow and wears a green dress (green is her favourite colour) and white socks. Bibi likes to use her magical powers to play practical jokes. Not only the mayor, but also the school principal, the teachers and many other people of Neustadt fall victim to her jokes. Her favourite mode of transport is her broomstick Kartoffelbrei (in German, it means "Mashed Potato", but in the English dub, Bibi calls it Apple Pie) which she can make fly by chanting spell rhymes, such as Eene meene Mei, Kartoffelbrei mein Flugzeug sei, Eene meene Mei, flieg los Kartoffelbrei or Eeene meene Schmieg, Kartoffelbrei los, flieg. Often, the journalist Karla Kolumna reports her jokes and adventures. Apart from her tendency to make jokes, Bibi has a big heart. She rescues the townspeople in many episodes, tries to help her friends and is opposed to injustice in the world.

Bibi's family
Bernhard and Barbara Blocksberg are Bibi's parents. Barbara is also a witch, and flies to the Walburgisnacht every year on her broomstick Baldrian (Baldrian, "Valerian" in English, is a common sleeping draught). In the first episodes, her eccentric cooking is a source of annoyance for her family. Barbara insists on cooking witches' food with ingredients such as spiders and frogs, even though no member of her family likes it. Once, she admits that she doesn't even like the food herself, but merely tries to uphold old witch traditions. When Barbara is tired of her family, she flies to visit her friend Amanda. She has a witch's laboratory, in which she often makes foul-smelling magical potions and experiments with various herbs. She feels responsible for upholding a "normal" life in her household and has thus set many rules in the Blocksberg house (for example no flying in through the window, no flying to school on the broomstick, use magic only in an emergency), but these rules are often broken. She frequently reminds her daughter of the witches' honour code, which for example forbids conjuring up money. Like many other adult witches, Barbara is a member of the Hexenrat (witches' council).

Bernard Blocksberg (Bernhard) has no magic powers, as these are exclusive to women. He would like to have a normal family, which he mentions in nearly every episode. He often forbids Barbara and Bibi to use magic, but they never listen to him. However, he is proud of "his" witches. He has a habit of reading the town newspaper every morning. Although Bernhard and Barbara often have arguments, which sometimes escalate to divorce threats, they love each other and in some later episodes go on romantic cruises, for example to Venice.

The first seven episodes of the audio drama series also feature Bibi's little brother Boris. He is often very jealous of Bibi's magical powers, which leads to many arguments between them. According to episode #1, he is eight years old. In episode #9, he moves to his grandparents' house at the North Sea. The reason that is given is that he has a cough and needs fresh sea air. He is never mentioned again and doesn't return to his parents and sister, not even on important occasions, such as when the Blocksbergs are moving into a new house.

Monica
Monica or Moni (Monika) is Bibi's best friend. She first appeared in episode #10 of the audio play series Bibis neue Freundin (Bibi's new friend), when she came to Bibi's class. Originally, she was unpopular. She often was unfriendly to her classmates. Because of her old-fashioned clothes and the fact that she used to live in a small village, she was called a Landpomeranze (a derogatory term used for a girl from the countryside). Only when Bibi found out that Moni has trouble with her very strict parents, she decided to help her, and they have been good friends since.

Marita
Marita is Bibi's best friend in later episodes. Bibi met her in episode #19 of the audio play series. Marita is a lot more self-confident than Bibi's other friend, Moni. Even though they sometimes have arguments, Bibi and Marita remain close friends. Marita appears often in later episodes and has many exciting adventures with Bibi.

Jonathan
Jonathan (Florian) is one of Bibi's best friends and a computer nerd. In later episodes, he also became a fan of Sherlock Holmes. He has helped Bibi raise a dinosaur and was present during many other adventures, which would often involve him looking up things on his computer. In the original German version, Bibi and the others often call him "Flori", while in the English version, they call him "Johnny". It is sometimes implied that Bibi's friend Moni might have a crush on Jonathan.

The Mayor
The Mayor's name is Bruno Pressak (Pressack is a type of German sausage, as well as a derogatory term for a corpulent person), but he is nearly always referred to as "The Mayor". He often makes many good promises, but his motive is always only money. He refers to Bibi as "Bibi Blocksbergi". This is due to the fact that in episode #3 Die Zauberlimonade (The magic lemonade), Bibi made him drink magic lemonade that forced him to add an "i" to every word he said. He has kept the habit ever since whenever he meets Bibi. He is dominant and rude to his secretary Pickler (Pichler). He loves food and is portrayed as overweight. He is sometimes presented as megalomanic. In episode #64 of the audio drama series and episode #12 of the animated series Die neue Schule (The New School), for instance, he orders a new city hall to be built in the shape of a castle, and in episode #63 Die Wahrsagerin (The fortune-teller), he visits a fortune-teller, who tells him he is going to be King of Neustadt, which causes him to order a regal robe and sceptre. He often appears a bit stupid and gullible, and his character is defined by a lust for profit and a habit of emphasising his own importance. However, he is never cruel. He has a good heart hidden deep inside of him.

Carla Caramba
Carla Caramba (Karla Kolumna) is a reporter, who is always looking for a big story. She is good friends with the Blocksberg family and often helps them. She often rides a motorcycle on her job. Her notable attributes are her high-pitched, shrill voice and loud laugh, her habit of talking very quickly and her catchphrase Sensational! (Sensationell!). She sometimes refers to the Mayor as her "dearest (or favourite) enemy". She enjoys presenting him as greedy. Carla also appears in the radio drama series Benjamin the Elephant and the Bibi Blocksberg spin-off, Bibi & Tina.

Flowipowi
Flowipowi (Flauipaui) is a young witch who is friends with Bibi and Sheba. She is obsessed with her appearance, often combing her long hair and looking at herself in the mirror. She is very easily scared. She is afraid of her magic teacher Auntie Mania, because she never understands her homework. However, she can be very brave in dangerous situations. She goes to magic school with Sheba Wartnose and Bibi Blocksberg. Her broomstick is called Gänseblümchen (Daisy).

Sheba Wartnose
Sheba Wartnose (Schubia Wanzhaar) is a young punk witch. She attends magic school with Bibi and Flowipowi. She has green hair and a motor broomstick called Kawakasi (probably a pun on the motorcycle manufacturer Kawasaki). She often has problems with her magic teacher Auntie Mania because she's inattentive. She is overconfident, but is good friends with Bibi and Flaupaui, whom she often teases. She appears tough, but has a soft heart. She wears punk clothes and always wears deep red lipstick.

Amanda
Even though Bibi refers to her as "Tante" (aunt), Amanda is not actually related to the Blocksbergs. She is a friend of Barbara's, who doesn't only have magical powers as well, but also shares her passion for witchcraft. In episode #77, it is revealed that she is the chairwoman of the witches' council's progressive wing.

Mania
Mania is the oldest witch in and a foundation member of the witches' council. In early episodes, she is portrayed as the typical evil witch of fairy tales, with a strong dislike for other people. In episode #35, she even conjures up eternal winter, only to spite her fellow witches. In later episodes, she is shown as friendlier, but still very strict and set in her own ways. She becomes the teacher of the young witches Bibi, Flauipaui and Schubia. She doesn't care much for Flauipaui and Schubia, but she likes Bibi's kindness and her good heart, as well as her talent in witchcraft. Mania owns several cats, owls and a black raven named Abraxas (which is also the name of The Little Witch's raven [Otfried Preußler]), whom she uses to send messages, as well as to keep her company.

Walpurgia
Walpurgia is the head of the witches' council. She is very strict and insists on rules to be followed. In addition to her position in the witches' council, she runs a boarding school for young witches, to which Bibi, Flauipaui and Schubia are sent temporarily in episode #77.

The Thunderstorms
Cecily Thunderstorm is Bibi's aunt from Ireland and also a witch. She first appears in episode #8, and afterwards in episodes #36 and #82. She is married to Patrick Thunderstorm, who, like Bernard Blocksberg, has no magic powers. Patrick owns a flying car, which has been enchanted by his wife. Their daughter Margie first had problems with Bibi, but when Bibi learned of the castle's financial problems, she helped Margie and they became friends. The two girls have stayed in touch since. Despite the fact that the Thuderstorms are Irish, they always speak German, even among themselves. Only occasionally do they use English terms or phrases, such as "darling" or "Oh yeah!".

Count Falko von Falkenstein
Count Falko von Falkenstein is the owner of the Martinshof, which he leases to Susanne Martin. He is very wealthy and has many noble horses. He loves to ride his dark Arab mare Cleopatra. Although Falko often makes an arrogant impression and values good manners, he is very good-natured and by no means superficial. He has friendly relations with Ms. Martin, with whom he was in school and had a liaison in his youth, and does not bother with their bourgeois income and simple origin. He owns and lives with his son Alexander at Falkenstein Castle. He owns numerous lands and forest land in the area. Count Falkenstein only appears in the Bibi Blocksberg episodes The Riding Stable, Part I & II, but constantly in Bibi & Tina, the sidequel following these episodes.

Cast

Further works
There have been two films about Bibi Blocksberg:
 2002: 
 2004: 
There is also an animated series with 60 episodes, but only the first 26 have been dubbed in English. There is also an animated film Geht's auch ohne Hexerei?.

There are also two spin-offs: Elea Eluanda, appearing as a guest in episode #78 of the radio show, and Bibi and Tina, in which Bibi has adventures on a riding farm with her new friend, Tina. Bibi & Tina was also adapted into an animated series.

Four films about Bibi and Tina:
 2014: 
 2014:  (in English: Bibi & Tina: Bewildered & Bewitched)
 2016:  (in English: Bibi & Tina: Girls vs. Boys)
 2017:  (in English: Bibi & Tina: Perfect Pandemonium)
Followed by an Amazon Prime Video series:
 2020:  (in English: Bibi & Tina)

Bibi has several cameo appearances in the series Benjamin the Elephant, also by Elfie Donnelly, and the general setting and some of the characters (especially Karla Kolumna) are the same in both audio play series.

The official mobile game "Bibi's Stardust Chase" was released in 2013.

Episodes

Animated series
Season 1 (1995-2005)
1. Der Wetterfrosch ("The Weather Frog")
2. Bibi als Prinzessin ("Bibi the Princess")
3. Bibi als Babysitter ("Bibi the Baby Sitter")
4. 3x schwarzer Kater ("The Black Cat")
5. Der Superhexspruch ("The Superspell")
6. Bibi im Dschungel ("Bibi in the Jungle")
7. Bibi und das Dino-Ei ("Bibi and the Dinosaur Egg")
8. Bibi und die Vampire ("Bibi and the Vampires")
9. Wo ist Kartoffelbrei? ("Where is Apple Pie?")
10. Das Wettfliegen ("The Flying Race")
11. Die Mathekrankheit ("The Math Disease")
12. Die neue Schule ("The New School")
13. Bibi im Orient ("Bibi Blocksberg in the Orient")
14. Bibi und die Weihnachtsmänner ("The Three Santas")
15. Bibi verliebt sich ("Bibi's First Crush")
16. Geht's auch ohne Hexerei? ("Let's Do It Without Magic")
Season 2 (2006)
17. Der weiße Kakadu ("The White Cocktaoo")
18. Superpudel Puck ("Prince the Super Poodle")
19. Das verhexte Dromedar ("The Enchanted Dromedary")
20. Abenteuer bei den Dinos ("Adventures with the Dinosaurs")
21. Der Hexenbann ("The Magic Ban")
22. Die Computerhexe ("The Computer Witch")
23. Der Hexengeburtstag ("The Witch's Birthday")
24. Die Schlossgespenster ("The Haunted Castle")
25. Hexerei im Zirkus ("Bibi Spells at the Circus")
26. Mamis Geburtstag ("Mom's Birthday")
Season 4 (2009)
27. Mami in Not ("Mommy in Need")
28. Eine wilde Kanufahrt ("A Wild Canoe Trip")
29. Der versunkene Schatz ("The Sunken Treasure")
30. Oma Grete sorgt für Wirbel ("Granny Greta Causes a Stir")
31. Hexspruch mit Folgen ("Witch with Consequences")
32. Die vertauschte Hexenkugel ("The Swapped Witch Ball")
33. Das Hexenhoroskop ("The Witch Horoscope")
34. Das siebte Hexbuch ("The Seventh Hex Book")
35. Der Turbobesen ("The Turbo Broom")
36. Das chinesische Hexenkraut ("The Chinese Witch Herb")
37. Die Klassenreise ("The Class Trip")
38. Der magische Sternenstaub ("The Magic Stardust")
39. Der Kobold aus dem Briefkasten ("The Goblin from the Mailbox")
Season 5 (2012)
40. Hexerei im Spukhaus ("Witchcraft in the Haunted House")
41. Die verhexten Marionetten("The Bewitched Puppets")
42. Der magische Koffer ("The Magic Suitcase")
43. Die verhexte Sternenreise ("The Bewitched Star Journey")
44. Der zerbrochene Besen ("The Broken Broom")
45. Manias magische Mixtur ("Mania's Magic Mixture")
46. Reise in die Vergangenheit ("Travel Back in Time")
47. Das magische Pendel ("The Magic Pendulum")
48. Papi als Clown ("Daddy as a Clown")
49. Die fremde Hexe ("The Strange Witch")
50. Das Hexenhotel ("The Witch Hotel")
51. Das große Besenrennen ("The Big Broom Race")
52. Kreuzfahrt mit Oma Grete ("Cruise with Granny Greta")
Season 6 (2019)
53. Ein Schultag voller Sensationen ("A School Day Full of Sensations")
54. Der neue Nachbar ("The New Neighbor")
55. Klitzeklein gehext ("Small Witchcraft")
56. Weihnachten bei Familie Blocksberg ("Fourth Christmas with the Blocksberg family")
57. Überraschung für Mania("Surprise for Mania")
58. Die Jagd nach dem Goldhexstein ("The Hunt for the Gold Hex Stone")
59. Das Diamantendiadem ("The Diamond Diadem")
60. Ausflug mit Hindernissen ("Excursion with Obstacles")

Audio drama

Memorable quotes

News anchorman: Now we proceed to international news. - The American president suffers from the measles. Hence he will not be able to meet up with the Soviet party leader, who is unavailable anyway because he still has to learn by heart a poem for Mothering Sunday. (Episode 2: Witchcraft at school)
News anchorman: Now we proceed to international news. - The American president today had Königsberg meatballs for lunch, which throws an entirely new light on the German question. (Episode 2: Witchcraft at school)
News anchorman: Paris. - The Eiffel Tower is still standing upright. (Episode 7: Heals the Mayor)
News anchorman: [...] in Madagascar. - No news from Madagascar today. -- Paris. - An invasion of migrating birds took place yesterday at night in Paris. As a part of a protesting manifestation, the militant birds occupied the uppermost floor of the Eiffel Tower. At this moment, they are still sitting there. (Episode 17: The Little Warlock)
Barbara (is sad that her husband Bernhard does not like duckdung soup and other witchy recipes): You will never excel from the mass of mankind.Bernhard: No indeed. And I don't want to excel! I want meatballs, and at once! (Episode 6: The Cow in the Sleeping Room)
Barbara: Well, if you've messed it up you have to admit it [and try to iron it out].Bernhard: Barbara! And afterwards you're surprised when our children use expressions like that!Barbara: No, I'm not surprised at all. They've got them from me.Bernhard: Oh dear! That witch drives me crazy. (Episode 3: The Magic Lemonade)
Bibi: Eene meene vamp, Marita's got an electric lamp. Hex hex! Sorry about the vamp, Marita. That's just what the spell's like. (Episode 46: Karla does not give up)
Bibi: Good afternoon. My name is Bibi Blocksberg and I poisoned the Mayor with magic lemonade.Porter: No bother. The official responsible for children is Mr. Berger, somewhere over there, third door to the left. (Epis. 3: The Magic Lemonade)
Hostel housemaster reads house regulations: It is forbidden [...] It is forbidden [...] It is forbidden [...] It is forbidden [...]Bibi: But what are the allowed things?Housemaster's wife: Everything, my dear child! Everything, with the exception of these few trifles.Moni: Does that include breathing?Joscha: I'm sorry, but my pen always makes so loud scratches. (Epis. 11: The School Trip)
(Bibi has been witched into the past as the only means to cure a daydream where she thinks she is a person from the past.)Bernhard: Where is my daughter??Barbara: Take a chill pill, Bernhard. Your daughter is where she belongs which is in the eighteenth century. (Epis. 32 As a Princess)
Barbara: A witch without a broomstick is almost like a man without a necktie.Bernhard: What is that supposed to mean? I almost never wear a necktie.Barbara: See? (Epis. 14 In America)

Theme song
Originally, the series had an instrumental theme. Later it was exchanged by a vocal theme song, arranged by Heiko Rüsse. Since episode #83, there has been a new theme song, arranged by Wolfgang W. Loos and Heiko Rüsse.

The proprietors have published both the old song  and the new song  on YouTube.

Criticism
Bibi Blocksberg is generally considered a good, entertaining and educational children's series.

It has however received criticism from the scientist Gerd Strohmeier. The cause of the criticism is the character of the incompetent and corrupt mayor of Neustadt, which Strohmeier claims will give a negative view of politics to children.

External links
 Official site
 A list of all episodes (Pdf)
 The Bibi Blocksberg cartoon
 Bibi Blocksberg cartoon at Kika, with a description of some characters

References

Audio plays
German literature
Blocksberg, Bibi
Blocksberg, Bibi
Blocksberg, Bibi
Slapstick comedy
German children's animated comedy television series
German children's animated fantasy television series
1997 German television series debuts
2012 German television series endings
2000s German television series
German-language television shows
Television shows set in Germany